Dehu Road railway station is a suburban railway station of Pune Suburban Railway. It is on the Mumbai–Pune railway route. It is owned by central railways department of Indian Railways. It has five platforms, six lines and one footbridge. This station was built for access to Dehu Road Cantonment. Today also this station is used for Indian Army.

Suburban 
 –Lonavala Locals
 Pune Junction–Talegaon Locals
 –Lonavala Local
 Shivajinagar–Talegaon Local

Express & Passengers 
 Mumbai–Kolhapur Sahyadri Express
 –Karjat Passenger
 Mumbai–Pandharpur Passenger
 Mumbai–Bijapur–Mumbai Passenger
 Mumbai–Shirdi Passenger

See also
 Dehu Road
 Pune Suburban Railway
 Maharashtra Cricket Association Stadium

References

Pune Suburban Railway
Pune railway division
Railway stations in Pune district